is the second video game (excluding the fan disc for the first game) in the Tokyo Majin Gakuen franchise, and an entry in said franchise's Hito no Shō (人の章, lit. "Mankind Chapter") setting. It was originally released on October 12, 2000, on the WonderSwan, and later ported to Game Boy Advance. Like most entries in the franchise, it has never been released outside Japan.

Story

Gameplay 
The player become a god who does battle using unique cards, of which 500 various types are available. The cards can be combined for greater powers and can be earned by connecting with other players and doing battle via link-up cable. The game's story covers thirteen chapters set in the unique Tokyo Majin Gakuen world. The story progresses through interactive conversation sequences, where the player's choices affect their path and the cards that they gain. The GBA version includes new characters and all-new cards, new rules and modes.

References

External links
 Tokyo Majin Gakuen series 5th Anniversary site  - site for the games Tokyo Majin Gakuen: Fuju Houroku and Tokyo Majin Gakuen Gehoucho: Kefurokou
 

2000 video games
Japan-exclusive video games
Game Boy Advance games
Game Boy Advance-only games
Tokyo Majin Gakuen Denki
Video games developed in Japan
Video games set in Tokyo